Frederick John Blundell (19 November 1850 – 26 April 1929) was an English cricketer. Blundell was a right-handed batsman who was a slow bowler.

Blundell represented Hampshire in one first-class match in 1880 against the Marylebone Cricket Club. In his only first-class innings Blundell made 1 run before being dismissed caught behind off the bowling of Robert Clayton. In the MCC innings Blundell took 2/22 from 17 overs, in a match that Hampshire won by an innings and 38 runs.

Blundell died in Botley, Hampshire on 26 April 1929.

External links
Frederick Blundell at Cricinfo
Frederick Blundell at CricketArchive

1850 births
1929 deaths
Cricketers from Southampton
English cricketers
Hampshire cricketers
People from South Stoneham
People from Botley, Hampshire